Period underwear (also known as menstrual underwear or period panties) are absorbent clothing designed to be worn during menstruation. Period underwears are designed like regular underwear but they are made up of highly absorbent fabrics to soak menstrual blood. Most of the period underwear companies use microfiber polyester. It’s recommended not to wear the same pair for more than 8-12 hours to avoid leakage and infection.

Overview 
The market for period underwear has developed as a response to consumer preference moving away from traditional menstrual hygiene management products, such as sanitary pads and tampons. Different brands use different, often patented, technology for anti-microbial action, moisture-wicking and optimal absorption. 

Julie Sygiel was cited by the BBC in 2015 as an early developer of the technology, with her company 'Dear Kate'.

Period underwear is considered to be an eco-friendly way to cut down on waste and reduce spending. It is estimated that  tampons, pads, and applicators, generates 200,000 tonnes of plastic waste in the UK each year. The USA also estimate more than 200,000 tonnes of waste annually. 

A reviewer in the New York Times described the product's features "some menstrual-underwear styles are gorgeous but leaky, and others have Hoover Dam–level security but diaper-like silhouettes. The style that will be best for you depends on your period flow and preferences".

Some manufacturers of period underwear are extending their ranges into other leak-proof clothes such as swimsuits, sportwear and sleepwear.

Risks 
Some companies (like Thinx, Ruby Love, and Knix) are facing class action lawsuits for period underwear products that contain harmful toxins like per- and polyfluoroalkyl substances (PFAS) which may be linked to adverse health outcomes like cancer. Thinx settled a lawsuit in January 2023

See also 
 Incontinence underwear

References 

Fashion
Feminine hygiene
Menstrual cycle
Sustainable products
Undergarments
Women's clothing
Women's health